1869 was the 83rd season of cricket in England since the foundation of Marylebone Cricket Club (MCC). The Cambridgeshire club went into demise, though a team called Cambridgeshire later played in two specially arranged matches, in 1869 against Yorkshire and in 1871 against Surrey. After that, Cambridgeshire ceased to be a first-class team. The problem was attributed to the lack of available amateurs to back up the famous trio of Bob Carpenter, the first Tom Hayward and George Tarrant, along with the absence of useful patronage and the difficulty of obtaining membership which led to a debt deemed unpayable.

1869 was also the season when W. G. Grace began a record-setting run of batting triumphs. For the first of three consecutive seasons, he established a new record for most runs in a season, and his six centuries doubled the previous record.

Playing record (by county)

Leading batsmen (qualification 15 innings)

Leading bowlers (qualification 800 balls)

Notable events 
 3 June: Although Parr, Carpenter and Hayward declined to play, the schism between the northern and southern professionals ended and the North v South match resumed at Kennington Oval. Freeman and Wootton were too good for the South, who lost by nine wickets on a pitch ruined by a very wet May.
 23 and 24 June: Charles Francis takes 17 for 40 for Rugby against Marlborough on a typically rough Lord's pitch, the best bowling figures in a public school game. Although he played no first-class cricket before 1870, in a review in 1919 when Greville Stevens played for the Gentlemen as a schoolboy, Francis was described as one of only five public school bowlers between 1840 and 1914 good enough for the Gentlemen.
 13 July: Tom Emmett becomes the first bowler to take sixteen wickets during a single day in first-class cricket, when against the dying Cambridgeshire club he takes 16 for 38 on a cut-up wicket described as "about as serviceable for cricket as a ploughed field". This feat has since been accomplished by James Southerton, Thomas Wass (twice), Bert Vogler, Colin Blythe, Jack White, Hedley Verity and Tom Goddard (the last to do so in 1939).
 16 and 17 July: The Gentlemen of the South, scoring 553 against the Players of the South, achieve the highest total in first-class cricket, beating the four-year-old MCC record of 523
 W.G. Grace and Bransby Cooper achieved a first-wicket record of 283 runs, which was not beaten until Herbie Hewett and Lionel Palairet scored 346 for Somerset against Yorkshire in 1892.
 11 August: W.G. Grace becomes the first first-class cricketer to score a century before lunch on the first day, when he hits up 116 for the MCC against Kent. Only John Sewell three seasons before had previously accomplished the feat on any day. In the process he beats Thomas Humphrey's 1865 record aggregate – Grace would set a new record in both 1870 and 1871.

Notes 
Hampshire, though regarded until 1885 as first-class, played no inter-county matches between 1868 and 1869 or 1871 and 1874
The others were Allan Steel in 1877, Sammy Woods in 1886, Charlie Townsend in 1895 and Jack Crawford in 1904 and 1905

References

Annual reviews 
 John Lillywhite's Cricketer's Companion (Green Lilly), Lillywhite, 1870
 Arthur Haygarth, Scores & Biographies, Volume 11 (1869–1870), Lillywhite, 1871
 John Wisden’s Cricketers' Almanac, 1870

External links 
 CricketArchive – season summaries

1869 in English cricket
English cricket seasons in the 19th century